Kevin Monangai (born March 4, 1993) is an American football running back who is currently a free agent. He played college football for the Villanova University Wildcats and received All-CAA honors. He was an assistant offensive coach for the New York Giants until January 2020.

Professional career

Philadelphia Eagles 
On August 1, 2015, Monangai signed to the Philadelphia Eagles. On September 1, 2015, he was waived.
On September 15, 2015, Monangai re-signed to the Eagles' practice squad. On September 22, 2015, he was released.
On December 29, 2015, Monangai re-signed to their practice squad. On January 4, 2016, Monangai signed a reserve/future contract. On May 5, 2016, he was waived.

Minnesota Vikings 
On August 4, 2016, Monangai signed with the Vikings. On August 20, 2016, Monangai was released by the Vikings.

Personal life 
Monangai grew up in Roseland, New Jersey and played high school football at Seton Hall Preparatory School. While at Seton Hall Prep, they lost at Randolph his freshman year. His brother Kyle Monangai is an incoming freshman football player at Rutgers University, and is following in his brother's footsteps in becoming a running back. His sister, Kathy Monangai, is a PharmD graduate of the University of Pittsburgh.

References

1993 births
Living people
American football running backs
People from Roseland, New Jersey
Philadelphia Eagles players
Players of American football from New Jersey
Seton Hall Preparatory School alumni
Sportspeople from Essex County, New Jersey
Villanova Wildcats football players